The Scottish Inland Waterways Association (SIWA) was a registered charity and association of canal societies and individual canal enthusiasts in Scotland.

The Association was founded in 1970 by canal enthusiasts who, after the closure of the Union Canal and the Forth & Clyde Canal, wanted to restore and preserve them as part of Scotland's historical, architectural and recreational assets.

SIWA explored the possibility of becoming a branch of the Inland Waterways Association (IWA), but decided against it. At SIWA's Inaugural Meeting, the General Secretary of IWA welcomed the setting up of a separate Scottish organisation.

By 1975, SIWA made it into print in the Shell Book of Inland Waterways: "SIWA ... holds a long-term and ambitious aim of seeing the waterways re-opened for sizeable craft throughout".

SIWA has many corporate and individual members who are helping to campaign on restoration, environmental, and day-to-day canal issues. This applies to both leisure and commercial users.

The Association works with British Waterways Scotland on both the Freshwater Group and the Saltwater Group, as well as the level of fees, the supply of services; and maintenance of navigation.

It also engages with British Waterways on restoring the navigability of the River Leven.

SIWA has strong links with the Inland Waterways Association Ireland (IWAI). An alternating exchange visit takes place every year. In 2008, the Scots visited the Irish, with visits to Lough Erne and Enniskillen. In 2009, the Irish have visited the Crinan Canal.

SIWA affiliated organisations
Bridge 19-40 Canal Society
Edinburgh Canal Society
Falkirk and District Canals Society
Forth and Clyde Canal Society
Forth Yacht Clubs Association
Great Glen Canal Users Association
Linlithgow Union Canal Society
Royal Yachting Association (Scotland)
Seagull Trust
Sycharwell Project
Members of the Caledonian Canal Operators Association:
Caley Cruisers
European Waterways
Jacobite Cruises
Highland Voyages
Caledonian Discovery
West Highland Sailing
Magna Carta Steamship Company
Capercaillie Cruisers / Black Prince

See also

Canals of the United Kingdom
History of the British canal system

References

Shell Book of Inland Waterways, David & Charles, 1975,

External links
Scottish Waterways Trust
Canal & River Trust
Inland Waterways Association Ireland

Water transport in Scotland
 
 
1970 establishments in Scotland
Charities based in Scotland
Organizations established in 1970